The 1917 Stockton-on-Tees by-election was a parliamentary by-election held for the House of Commons constituency of Stockton-on-Tees in County Durham on 20 March 1917.

Vacancy
The by-election was caused by the death of the sitting Liberal MP, Jonathan Samuel on 22 February 1917.

Candidates
The Stockton Liberal Association considered a number of possible candidates but decided upon Bertrand Watson, a 38-year-old local man, a solicitor who was a former Mayor of Stockton-on-Tees and member of Durham County Council.
The Unionists had indicated that they would not oppose a Liberal candidate who supported the wartime Coalition government of which they were members.
The Labour Party in Stockton considered putting up a candidate. They invited Robert Dennison, a Trade Union official with the British Steel Smelters' Association, to address them with a view to becoming their candidate but in the end decided not to put forward a challenge to the wartime party truce.  Dennison did later go on to become Labour MP for Birmingham King's Norton from 1924-1929.
The by-election was however contested by banker Edward Backhouse JP of Darlington, a proponent of the Peace by Negotiation Party and a member of the Society of Friends.

The issues
The by-election was described in the press as quiet and lacking outward signs of public interest. The prosecution of the war was the only issue of the day and Backhouse failed to capture the public imagination with many local men away serving in the armed forces. He often faced a hostile reception. One of his meetings was broken up by an angry crowd which stormed the platform preventing his guest from speaking.

The result
Watson easily held the seat for the Liberals and the Coalition, the pacifist candidate polling even less well than anticipated.

Result

References

See also
List of United Kingdom by-elections
United Kingdom by-election records

1917 elections in the United Kingdom
1917 in England
By-elections to the Parliament of the United Kingdom in County Durham constituencies
Politics of the Borough of Stockton-on-Tees
20th century in County Durham